The 1968 United States House of Representatives elections were elections for the United States House of Representatives on November 5, 1968, to elect members to serve in the 91st United States Congress. They coincided with Richard M. Nixon's election as president. Nixon's narrow victory yielded only limited gains for his Republican Party, which picked up a net of five seats from the Democratic Party. The Democrats retained a majority in the House.

The election coincided with the presidential campaign of George Wallace of the American Independent Party, who unsuccessfully attempted to deny a majority in the Electoral College to any of his opponents.  Had Wallace succeeded he would have given the House the choice of president from among the three, for the first time since 1825. As a result of this election, Democrats formed a majority of 26 state House delegations, with Republicans forming a majority in 19 and the other five delegations being evenly split (each state's House delegation receives one vote in such an election).  However, the Democrats' nominal majority of state delegations includes those of the Southern states who were more inclined to support Wallace as opposed to Democratic candidate Hubert Humphrey.  Wallace believed the Southern representatives would be able to use the clout his campaign was trying to give them to force an end to federal desegregation efforts in the South.

Overall results

Summary of the November 5, 1968 election results

Special elections

Alabama

Alaska

Arizona

Arkansas

California

Colorado

Connecticut

Delaware

Florida

Georgia

Hawaii 

|-
! rowspan=2 | 
| Spark Matsunaga
|  | Democratic
| 1962
| Incumbent re-elected.
| rowspan=2 nowrap | 

|-
| Patsy Mink
|  | Democratic
| 1964
| Incumbent re-elected.

|}

Idaho

Illinois

Indiana

Iowa

Kansas

Kentucky

Louisiana

Maine

Maryland

Massachusetts

Michigan

Minnesota

Mississippi

Missouri

Montana

Nebraska

Nevada

New Hampshire

New Jersey

New Mexico

New York

North Carolina

North Dakota

Ohio

Oklahoma

Oregon

Pennsylvania

Rhode Island

South Carolina

South Dakota

Tennessee

Texas

Utah

Vermont

Virginia

Washington

West Virginia

Wisconsin

Wyoming

See also
 1968 United States elections
 1968 United States gubernatorial elections
 1968 United States Senate elections
 90th United States Congress
 91st United States Congress

External links
Statistics of the Presidential and Congressional Election, 1968